The following is a list of important scholarly resources related to John Quincy Adams, the sixth president of the United States.

Secondary sources
 

 
  Fulltext in Swetswise, Ingenta and Ebsco.
 
 
 
 Cameron, Duncan; Dick, Andrew; Fitzmaurice, Paul; & others. (2015) An American President in Ealing: The John Quincy Adams Diaries, 1815–1817. Publisher: Little Ealing History Group. 
 
  Fulltext in Project Muse. Adams role in antislavery petitions debate 1835–44.
 
 
 Heffron, Margery M. "'A Fine Romance': The Courtship Correspondence between Louisa Catherine Johnson and John Quincy Adams", New England Quarterly, June 2010, Vol. 83 Issue 2, pp. 200–18
 Holt, Michael F. The Rise and Fall of the American Whig Party: Jacksonian Politics and the Onset of the Civil War. 1999.
 
 
  Biography
 Lewis, James E. Jr. John Quincy Adams: Policymaker for the Union. Scholarly Resources, 2001. 164 pp.
  fulltext online
 
 
 Melanson, James. "'Entangling Affiances with None': John Quincy Adams, James K. Polk, and the Impact of Conflicting Interpretations", New England Journal of History, Fall 2009, Vol. 66 Issue 1, pp. 26–36, on Monroe Doctrine
  Shows that both men considered splitting the country as a solution.
  Also published as Arguing About Slavery: John Quincy Adams and the Great Battle in the United States Congress.
 Morris, Walter John (1963) John Quincy Adams, Germanophile, Pennsylvania State University
 
 
  excerpt and text search
 
 
  Fulltext online at Jstor and Ebsco. He tried to create a national observatory, which became the U.S. Naval Observatory.
 Pessen, Edward. "John Quincy Adams" in Henry Graff, ed. The Presidents: A Reference History (3rd ed. 2002) online
  Fulltext online at Swetswise and Ebsco.
 
 
 
 
 Unger, Harlow Giles. John Quincy Adams (2012), biography
 Waldstreicher, David, ed. A Companion to John Adams and John Quincy Adams (2013)  excerpt and text search; 600pp; 25 essays by scholars

Primary sources

Online Collections
 
 

Adams, John Quincy
Adams, John Quincy
Adams, John Quincy
Adams, John Quincy
Adams, John Quincy
John Quincy Adams